Tennessee Waltz is a Patti Page album, issued by Mercury Records as a 10" long-playing record, as catalog number MG-25154.

Track listing

References

1952 albums
Patti Page albums
Mercury Records albums